The Ferrers School is a coeducational secondary school and sixth form with academy status, located in Higham Ferrers, Northamptonshire, England, UK.

The school was founded in 1980. It previously held specialist status as an Arts College, and changed its name to The Ferrers Specialist Arts College for a time. After converting to academy status in September 2013 the school changed its name to The Ferrers School.

The headteacher is Angela Smith. There were approximately 930 students in Years 7 to 11 on roll in the 2011-2012 academic year, plus around 160 students in the sixth form, which is shared with two other local schools. There are 77 teachers (full-time equivalent) and 54 support staff.

Feeder School
The school admits its Year 7 pupils from Higham Ferrers Junior School and Henry Chichele Primary School, as well as numerous primary schools in surrounding villages, and from Rushden.

Sixth form provision
The school does not produce enough sixth form students to make an independent sixth form viable, and so it is part of the East Northamptonshire College with two other local schools (Huxlow Academy and Rushden Community College).

Achievement
In an Ofsted report in 2015,  the school was deemed to be providing a "Good" quality of education in all main areas (Leadership and management, behaviour and safety, quality of teaching and achievement of pupils). In the same year the school achieved results of 46% of students gaining at least 5 GCSEs at C grade or above including English and Mathematics.

The percentage of students achieving 5+ GCSEs, including maths and English, were as follows:

 2012: 54%
 2013: 48%
 2014: 52% 
 2015: 46%

References

External links
School website

Educational institutions established in 1980
Secondary schools in North Northamptonshire
1980 establishments in England
Academies in North Northamptonshire